Aldo Valletti (1930–1992) was an Italian film actor best known for the role of President Curval in Salò, or the 120 Days of Sodom, directed by Pier Paolo Pasolini.

Biography 
Aldo Valletti was born 1930 in Rome. His first appearance in cinema, not credited, dates back to 1956, in Poveri ma belli by Dino Risi.

After numerous uncredited and minor roles, in 1975, he was chosen by Pasolini to appear in the film Salò, or the 120 Days of Sodom, in which he was dubbed by Marco Bellocchio. Answering a question about the choice of Valletti for Salò, Pasolini said: "This is a generic actor that in more twenty years of work has never spoken a word."

Later, he appeared in a number of films in supporting roles, working with, among others, Damiano Damiani, Fernando Di Leo, Tinto Brass and Steno; his last appearance was in 1980, in Arrivano i gatti by Carlo Vanzina.

Filmography

Notes

External links

 Youtube Channel on Aldo Valletti

Italian male actors
People of Lazian descent
Male actors from Rome
1930 births
1992 deaths